KAVZ-LP (102.5 FM) is a radio station licensed to Deming, Washington, United States.  The station is currently owned by Van Zandt Community Hall Association.

History
The station went on the air as KNOO-LP on June 4, 2004.  On August 5, 2006, the station changed its call sign to the current KAVZ-LP.

See also
List of community radio stations in the United States

References

External links
 

AVZ-LP
AVZ-LP
Community radio stations in the United States
Radio stations established in 2004